Děti Země (Children of the Earth – COE) is a Czech citizens' association for environmental protection.

COE was founded in September 1989, shortly before the Velvet revolution in Czechoslovakia, as an unofficial initiative of several ecological activists in Prague.

In the last two decades Dětí Země lobbied for ozone layer protection, sustainable transport and air quality, among other issues. Today there are eleven local branches in eleven cities all over the Czech Republic with its headquarters being in Plzeň.

Members of the Honorary Board are Jiří Dědeček, Erazim Kohák, Vladimír Merta, Zdeněk Thoma, Jaroslav Pavlíček and Jan Vodňanský. Ivan Dejmal, ex-dissident (Charta 77) and the first Czech Minister of Environment was a longtime supporter of COE.

References

Bibliography (part) 
 M. Patrik (editor): Dopravní politika v Evropě z pohledu nevládních organizací (sborník), Praha 1992 
 J. Růžička:Cesty k udržitelné dopravě ve městech, Brno 1993, 
 R. Jungk: Atomový stát. Od pokroku k nelidskosti (The Nuclear State), Praha 1994
 M. Šuta: Účinky výfukových plynů z automobilů na lidské zdraví, 2008

External links 
 Dětí Země - official web

Environmental organizations based in the Czech Republic